Henry's Grove is a historic home located at Berlin, Worcester County, Maryland, United States. It was built in 1792, and is a -story gable-roofed brick house with all walls laid in Flemish bond. The house retains virtually all of its original interior detailing. Also on the property are a 20th-century frame tenant house and four frame outbuildings. It was built for a planter, John Fassitt, whose initials and the date 1792 are inscribed on a plaque in a gable end.

Henry's Grove was listed on the National Register of Historic Places in 1984.

References

External links
, including undated photo, at Maryland Historical Trust

Berlin, Maryland
Houses in Worcester County, Maryland
Houses on the National Register of Historic Places in Maryland
Historic American Buildings Survey in Maryland
Houses completed in 1792
National Register of Historic Places in Worcester County, Maryland